The Dapper Dans are a barbershop quartet that performs at Disneyland in Anaheim, California (since 1959), at the Magic Kingdom at the Walt Disney World Resort (since 1971), and at Hong Kong Disneyland in Lantau Island, Hong Kong (from 2005 to 2008). A quartet (from the UK) also performed at Disneyland Paris from the opening in 1992 until 1995 and were known as The Main Street Quartet.
The Paris quartet, known as “Nickelodeon” before joining the park, comprised Martin Baker, Mark Grindall, Steve Green and Jim Mullen. The quartet continued together after leaving Disney and still sing together from time to time. The Bass, Mark Grindall, still works extensively in Barbershop as a successful vocal coach and choral director. 

In the 1993 The Simpsons episode Homer's Barbershop Quartet, The Be Sharps' singing voices were partly provided by the Dapper Dans. Before working on the episode, Jeff Martin had seen one of the quartet's performances and enjoyed it. When the episode's production began, he contacted the quartet, and they agreed to make a guest appearance in the episode. The Dapper Dans' singing was intermixed with the normal voice actors' voices, often with a regular voice actor singing the melody and The Dapper Dans providing backup.

Members of the Dapper Dans  have included the Barbershop Harmony Society international collegiate quartet gold medalists Aaron Stratton, Paul Hesson, Chad Bennett, and Eric Monson; film and TV actor-comedian Monty Jordan; Grammy Award winning Audio Engineer Tom Knox.

References

Walt Disney Parks and Resorts entertainment
Disneyland
Magic Kingdom
Hong Kong Disneyland
Barbershop quartets
Main Street, U.S.A.
Musical groups established in 1959
1959 establishments in California
Disney people
Vocal quartets